Xishi Temple is a Buddhist temple located in Xishan Town of Guiping, Guangxi, China. Xishi Temple was listed among the National Key Buddhist Temple in Han Chinese Area in 1983. It is a renowned Bhikkhuni temple in southwest China's Guangxi Zhuang Autonomous Region. Xishi Temple is known for the Xishan Tea, which have been exported to many countries and regions over the world.

History
Xishi Temple was built in the year 1646 at the nascent Qing dynasty (1644-1911). Xishi Temple was restored and renovated in both Yongzheng and Qianlong periods. The present version was completed in 1809 in the Jiaqing period.

In 1983, Xishi Temple was classified as a National Key Buddhist Temple in Han Chinese Area by the State Council of China.

Architecture
The most important halls include the Shanmen, Mahavira Hall, Three-Saint Hall, Jade Buddha Hall, Guanyin Hall, and Faxiang Hall.

Mahavira Hall
The Mahavira Hall is the main hall of the temple. The statue of Sakyamuni is enshrined in the center with Manjushri and Samantabhadra standing on both sides.

References

Buddhist temples in Guangxi
Buildings and structures in Guigang
Tourist attractions in Guigang
17th-century establishments in China
17th-century Buddhist temples
Religious buildings and structures completed in 1646
Linji school temples